George A. Bekey is an American roboticist and the Professor Emeritus of Computer Science, Electrical Engineering and Biomedical Engineering at the University of Southern California.

In 1989, Bekey became a member of the National Academy of Engineering for pioneering work in computer sciences contributing to biomedical engineering, man-machine systems, and robotics. He is also a Fellow of various professional societies. 

Bekey is best known for his achievements across multiple technical fields, for which he was designated a USC University Professor, which honors the university's most accomplished, multi-disciplinary faculty. He is also affiliated with the College of Engineering at  California Polytechnic State University, San Luis Obispo, where he teaches a course on world religions.  

His most recent book is Autonomous Robots: From Biological Inspiration to Implementation and Control from MIT Press.

Robot Ethics
Lately he has concerned himself with the ethics and social aspects of robots as they play more of a role in different aspects of human life, realising an edited text bringing together some of the key thinkers in the field including James Hughes, Selmer Bringsjord, Kevin Warwick, Peter Asaro and Noel Sharkey.

Education
 B.S. (Electrical Engineering) University of California, Berkeley, 1950.
 M.S (Engineering) University of California, Los Angeles, 1952.
 Ph.D. (Engineering) University of California, Los Angeles, 1962.

References

External links
 Home page
 Profile on National Academy of Engineering's Website

Year of birth missing (living people)
Living people
American roboticists
Control theorists
Fellows of the Association for the Advancement of Artificial Intelligence
UCLA Henry Samueli School of Engineering and Applied Science alumni
UC Berkeley College of Engineering alumni
University of Southern California faculty
Members of the United States National Academy of Engineering